Jean Mathonet (6 October 1925, Bévercé, Malmedy – 22 October 2004, Malmedy) was a Belgian football player who finished top scorer of the Belgian First Division with 26 goals in 1956 while playing for Standard Liège.  He played 13 times with the Belgium national team between 1952 and 1958. Mathonet made his international debut on Christmas 1952 in a 0–1 friendly win against France.

References

1925 births
2004 deaths
People from Malmedy
Belgian footballers
Standard Liège players
Belgium international footballers
Belgian Pro League players
Association football forwards
Footballers from Liège Province